Ioannis Pittas (born 10 July 1996) is a Cypriot footballer who plays as a left winger for Apollon Limassol in the Cypriot First Division. He is the son of former Apollon Limassol and Cyprus international defender Pambos Pittas.

International
He made his Cyprus national football team debut on 8 June 2019 in a Euro 2020 qualifier against Scotland, as an 80th-minute substitute for Andreas Makris.

Career statistics

International career

International goals
Scores and results list Cyprus's goal tally first.

Honours
Apollon Limassol
 Cypriot First Division: 2021–22
 Cypriot Cup: (2) 2015–16, 2016–17
 Cypriot Super Cup: (2) 2016, 2017

References

External links
 
 

1996 births
Living people
Cypriot footballers
Cypriot First Division players
Apollon Limassol FC players
Association football midfielders
Enosis Neon Paralimni FC players
Cyprus under-21 international footballers
Cyprus international footballers